Mercy Brown (born 20 June 1996 in London) is an English weightlifter. She holds three British records.

Early career

Brown started lifting in 2011 at the age of 15. She earned her first medal (bronze) in 2013 at the European U17 Championship.

Major results

Junior results
 2016 European Junior Championships: Bronze 
 2016 World Junior Championships: Bronze 
 2015 European Junior Championships: Gold 
 2015 World Junior Championships: 8th
 2014 European Junior Championships: Bronze
 2014 World Junior Championships: 6th

References

External links

British Weightlifting Profile

1996 births
Living people
Sportspeople from London
English female weightlifters
Commonwealth Games competitors for England
Weightlifters at the 2014 Commonwealth Games
Black British sportswomen
Universiade medalists in weightlifting
Universiade bronze medalists for Great Britain
European Weightlifting Championships medalists
Medalists at the 2017 Summer Universiade